Antoniazzi is an Italian surname. It derived from the Antonius root name. Notable people with the surname include:

Gaetano Antoniazzi (1825–1897), Italian violin maker 
Gianni Antoniazzi (born 1998), Swiss footballer
Ilario Antoniazzi (born 1948), Italian archbishop of Tunis
Manon Antoniazzi (born 1965), British civil servant
Riccardo Antoniazzi (1853–1912), Italian violin maker
Romeo Antoniazzi (1862–1925), Italian violin maker
Tonia Antoniazzi (born 1971), British politician

See also

Angelo Antonazzo

References

Italian-language surnames
Patronymic surnames
Surnames from given names